Robert Henricks (born 1943) is an American theologian, currently the Preston Kelsey Professor of Religion, Emeritus at Dartmouth College, specializing in Asian literature and religion.

References

Dartmouth College faculty
American theologians
1943 births
Living people
Date of birth missing (living people)